Ariel Crossroad is an unincorporated community in Marion County, South Carolina, United States, located at the intersection of US 501 and SC 41,  southeast of Marion. West of the Little Pee Dee River, the area is a predominantly farming community. Variant names include: Arial Cross Roads, Arial Crossroads, Arials Crossroads and Ariel Cross Roads.

References

Unincorporated communities in Marion County, South Carolina
Unincorporated communities in South Carolina